Muthoot Pappachan Group, also known as Muthoot Blue, is an Indian financial services conglomerate founded in 1887 by Ninan Mathai Muthoot. Headquartered in Trivandrum, Kerala, the group has a workforce of more than 26,000 employees across 4,200 branches in India. Apart from financial services, the group has business interests in hospitality, automotive dealerships, real estate, healthcare, IT services, precious metals, alternate energy, and security services.

History
The family business was founded in 1887 by Muthoot Ninan Mathai in Kozhencherry, Kerala. Mathai initially traded in timber and food grains, supplying rations to large British-run plantations.

In 1939, the group established banking and finance services to provide immediate financial assistance to customers in rural and non-rural areas through easy secured loans. Post-independence, the demand for credit increased as individuals discovered their household gold as a safe and convenient means to get credit. Mathai then moved into the gold loan business.

In 1979, the business was split among the founder’s three surviving sons. The eldest son, M. George Muthoot, moved out of Kerala and set up Muthoot Finance. The youngest son, Mathew M. Thomas, also known as Muthoot Pappachan, then incorporated Muthoot Pappachan Group.

References

Companies based in Thiruvananthapuram
Indian companies established in 1887
Conglomerate companies established in 1887
Conglomerate companies of India